This article lists public artworks which used to exist in London, but which have either been destroyed or removed to another place. Works which have been moved within London are not included, nor are temporary installations such as those on the Fourth plinth at Trafalgar Square. However, where one statue has been removed and replaced by another similar one, the former is included in this list.

Works removed or lost

 

 Prior to the installation of the present statue of Oliver Cromwell in Parliament Square there was a different statue of Cromwell in another part of the square. It looked very similar to the one by Matthew Noble currently in Wythenshawe, Manchester, but it is not clear whether this is the same statue or one is a copy of the other.

Works replaced by replicas

 The statue of Queen Anne by Francis Bird which stood outside St. Paul's Cathedral was damaged by a lunatic in the 19th century, and as it was in any case in rather poor condition, it was removed, together with the four statues at its base, and replaced by a copy, partly the work of Richard Belt. The original was moved to a location near St Leonards in Sussex.
 The Victoria Palace Theatre had a figure on its roof of a dancer (possibly representing Anna Pavlova, by some accounts). It was taken down to protect it from the bombing during World War II, and apparently was mislaid as a result. A replica of the original was installed in 2006.

Works removed and subsequently returned

 The statue of Charles II in Soho Square was removed for many years to Grim's Dyke, the estate of W. S. Gilbert, and returned to its current position after the death of Gilbert's widow, who had willed it back to the square. It was originally accompanied by four other statues representing British rivers, and the current whereabouts of these is unknown; they have probably been destroyed or buried.

See also
Actions against memorials in the United Kingdom during the George Floyd protests
List of demolished buildings and structures in London
Lost artworks
Works by Banksy that have been damaged or destroyed

References

Bibliography

 

 

 

 

Lists of buildings and structures in London
Former buildings and structures in London by building type
Monuments and memorials in London
London
Former